This is a list of Superfund sites in Indiana designated under the Comprehensive Environmental Response, Compensation, and Liability Act (CERCLA) environmental law.  The CERCLA federal law of 1980 authorized the United States Environmental Protection Agency (EPA) to create a list of polluted locations requiring a long-term response to clean up hazardous material contaminations.   These locations are known as Superfund sites, and are placed on the National Priorities List (NPL).  The NPL guides the EPA in "determining which sites warrant further investigation" for environmental remediation.  As of June 29, 2022, there have been 53 total Superfund sites on the National Priorities List in Indiana.  No additional sites are currently proposed for entry on the list.  Thirteen sites have been cleaned up and removed from the list.

Superfund sites

See also
List of Superfund sites in the United States
List of environmental issues
List of waste types
TOXMAP

External links
EPA list of proposed Superfund sites in Indiana
EPA list of current Superfund sites in Indiana
EPA list of Superfund site construction completions in Indiana
EPA list of partially deleted Superfund sites in Indiana
EPA list of deleted Superfund sites in Indiana
EPA Region 5 Superfund NPL Fact Sheets for Indiana

References

Indiana
Superfund
Superfund